T.S. Suresh Babu is an Indian film director, concentrating mainly on Malayalam movies. He started his career in the cinema industry by assisting the renowned director P.G. Viswambharan. He started his career as an independent director under the name Reji with the successful film Itha Innu Muthal starring Shankar, Mammootty and Mohanlal together. His Kottayam Kunjachan is regarded as a cult classic in Malayalam cinema 
He is also a board member of KSFDC.

Filmography

References

External links

Year of birth missing (living people)
Living people
Film directors from Thiruvananthapuram
Malayalam film directors
20th-century Indian film directors
21st-century Indian film directors
Screenwriters from Thiruvananthapuram
Malayalam screenwriters